A philomath is a lover of learning and studying. Philomathy is similar to, but distinguished from, philosophy in that -soph, the latter suffix, specifies "wisdom" or "knowledge", rather than the process of acquisition thereof. Philomath is not synonymous with polymath, as a polymath is someone who possesses great and detailed knowledge and facts from a variety of disciplines, while a philomath is someone who greatly enjoys learning and studying.

Overview 
The shift in meaning for mathema is likely a result of the rapid categorization during the time of Plato and Aristotle of their "mathemata" in terms of education: arithmetic, geometry, astronomy, and music (the quadrivium), which the Greeks found to create a "natural grouping" of mathematical (in the modern usage; "doctrina mathematica" in the ancient usage) precepts.

In a philosophical dialogue, King James first penned the character Philomathes to debate on arguments of whether the ancient religious concepts of witchcraft should be punished in a politically fueled Christian society. The arguments King James poses through the character Epistemon are based on concepts of theological reasoning regarding society's belief, as his opponent, Philomathes, takes a philosophical stance on society's legal aspects but seeks to obtain the knowledge of Epistemon. This philosophical approach signified a philomath seeking to obtain greater knowledge through epistemology. The dialogue was used by King James to educate society on various concepts including the history and etymology of the subjects debated.

See also 
 Benjamin Franklin, who used this pen name
 Philomath, Oregon
 Philomathean Literary Society (Erskine College)
 Philomathean Society, a literary society at the University of Pennsylvania
 Philomathean Society (New York University)
 Philomaths, Polish secret student organization that existed, 1817–1823, at the Imperial University of Vilnius

References

External links 
 Philomath on Dictionary.com

Words